Václav Luks (born 14 November 1970) is a Czech harpsichordist, horn player, conductor, musicologist and pedagogue, founder and artistic director of the Prague baroque orchestra Collegium 1704 and of the vocal ensemble Collegium Vocale 1704. He specialises in Baroque music, especially in the works of Jan Dismas Zelenka, Johann Sebastian Bach, George Frideric Handel, and others. His activities have played an important role in reviving interest in the works of Czech composers including Zelenka and Josef Mysliveček. In 2022, Luks was awarded the title of Knight of the French Ministry of Culture, Arts and Letters.

Education 
Luks studied at the Pilsen Conservatoire in classes of French horn and piano and at the Academy of Performing Arts in Prague; in 1992, he resumed his studies at the Schola Cantorum Basiliensis in the studios of Jörg-Andreas Bötticher and Jesper Christensen (in the fields of historical keyboard instruments and historical performance practice), graduating as a soloist in 1997. During his studies in Basel and in the years that followed, he gave concerts in Europe and overseas as the principal horn player of the Akademie für Alte Musik in Berlin.

Collegium 1704 and Collegium Vocale 1704 
Upon his return from abroad, Luks transformed a chamber ensemble which he founded during his studies into the Prague baroque orchestra Collegium 1704 and the affiliated vocal ensemble Collegium Vocale 1704: the most immediate impulse was the project Bach — Prague — 2005, initiated by Luks himself. Since 2007, the ensemble has been making regular guest appearances at festivals and concert halls all over Europe: the Salzburger Festspiele (2015, 2016, 2018), the Berliner Philharmonie, London’s Wigmore Hall, Vienna’s Theater an der Wien and Konzerthaus, the Lucerne Festival, BOZAR (Palais des Beaux-Arts) in Brussels, the Chopin Festival in Warsaw, Wratislavia Cantans, and the Elbphilharmonie, and it is an ensemble-in-residence at the festival Oude Muziek in Utrecht and at the Leipzig Bachfest. In 2008, Music Bridge Prague — Dresden began, bringing together the two cities’ wealth of cultural traditions. In 2012 Collegium 1704 started a concert series at the Rudolfinum in Prague. Since autumn 2015, the two cycles have been merged into a single concert season that continues to take place in parallel in Prague and Dresden. In 2019 Collegium Vocale 1704 launched a series of chamber choir concerts in Prague. The ensemble cooperates with prominent soloists, both Czech and international, including Magdalena Kožená, Bejun Mehta, Simona Houda-Šaturová, Martina Janková, Hana Blažíková, Karina Gauvin, Lisandro Abadie, and others.

Work with other ensembles 
In addition to his work with Collegium 1704, Václav Luks also collaborates with international ensembles including Camerata Salzburg, the Akademie für Alte Musik in Berlin, La Cetra Barockorchester Basel, and the Dresdner Kammerchor. Amongst his recent projects have been performances of Purcell’s opera Dido and Aeneas with Ensemble Pygmalion at the Festival d’Aix-en-Provence and a programme with works by Polish composers with the ensemble Orkiestra Historyczna. At a benefit concert for the restoration of the Cathédrale Notre-Dame de Paris, Václav Luks conducted the Orchestre nationale de France.

Teaching 
Between 1996 and 1999, Luks taught basso continuo at the Academy of Performing Arts in Prague, and in 2001–2003 he lectured at the Hochschule für Musik und Theater “Felix Mendelssohn-Bartholdy” in Leipzig. He has also worked with the Janáček Academy of Music in Brno and he is regularly invited to sit on juries of international competitions (Schmelzer-Wettbewerb Melk, Prague Spring 2012).

Opera and theatre 
In 2009/2010, Collegium 1704 under Luks's baton performed Handel's Rinaldo at the National Theatre in Prague at Théâtre de Caen, Opéra de Rennes, and Grand Théâtre du Luxembourg. In 2013, they performed Josef Mysliveček’s opera L’olimpiade and the production was nominated for the 2014 International Opera Awards. In 2017, they followed with Antonio Vivaldi’s Arsilda, regina di Ponto in its modern-era world premiere, directed by David Radok - the premiere took place at the Slovak National Theatre in Bratislava and the production toured several European citites, including Opéra de Lille, Théâtre de la ville de Luxembourg, Théâtre de Caen, and Opéra Royale de Versailles. In 2022, Collegium 1704 under his direction staged G. F. Handel's Alcina at the National Theatre Brno, in co-production with Théâtre de Caen and Opéra Royale de Versailles, and the production was renewed in 2023.

Film projects 
In 2014 Collegium 1704 led by Luks collaborated with Bejun Mehta on a DVD of Gluck’s opera Orfeo ed Euridice with the stage director Ondřej Havelka, and with Rolando Villazón on the making of the BBC 2 documentary Mozart in Prague. The ensemble took part in making the director Petr Václav’s epic historical film Il Boemo (2022) about the life of Josef Mysliveček, and previously in the director's documentary about Mysliveček, Confessions of the Vanished (2015).

Cooperation with radio stations 
Václav Luks works in cooperation with a number of broadcasting networks such as Deutschlandradio Berlin, Schweizer Radio DRS, the Austrian Broadcasting Company (ÖRF), and Radio France and with music publishers including Supraphon, Pan Classics, Zig-Zag Territoires, Arta, and Accent.

Discography 

 Bedřich Smetana: My Country (Accent, 2022)
 Luigi Cherubini: Requiem C Minor / Karol Kurpiński: Te Deum, sol. Simona Šaturová (Narodowy Instytut Fryderyka Chopina, 2021)
 Jean-Philippe Rameau: Les Boréades (Chateau de Versailles Spectacles 2020)
Jan Dismas Zelenka: Missa 1724 (Accent, 2020)
 Magdalena Kožená: Il giardino dei sospiri | Marcello, Vinci, Leo, Gasparini, Händel (Accent, 2019)
 Georg Frideric Handel: Messiah (Accent, 2019)
 Johann Sebastian Bach: Oboe concertos et cantatas (Accent, 2018)
 Josef Mysliveček: Violin Concertos (Accent, 2018)
 Jan Dismas Zelenka: Sonatas ZWV 181 | a 2 oboi (violino) e 2 bassi obligati /2CD/ (Accent, 2017)
 Jan Dismas Zelenka: Missa Divi Xaverii ZWV 12 (Accent, 2015)
 Johann Sebastian Bach: Mše h moll BWV 232 (Accent, 2013)
 Jan Dismas Zelenka: Officium defunctorum ZWV 47 / Requiem ZWV 46 (Accent, 2011)
 Antonín Reichenauer: Concertos | Koncerty (Supraphon, 2010)
 Jan Dismas Zelenka: I Penitenti al Sepolcro del Redentore (Zig-Zag Territoires, 2009)
 Jan Dismas Zelenka: Missa votiva (Zig-Zag Territoires, 2008)
 Jan Dismas Zelenka: Composizioni per Orchestra | Orchestrální skladby (Supraphon, 2005)
 Jiří Antonín Benda: Harpsichord Concertos | Koncerty pro cembalo (ARTA Records, 2005)
 Henrico Albicastro: Concerti a quattro, op. 4 (PAN Classics, 2001)

References

External links 
Václav Luks on the Collegium 1704 official website
 Václav Luks on France Musique
 Václav Luks on the BBC
 Bach & Zelenka: Jan Dismas Zelenka: "Te Deum" [ZWV 146 - Collegium 1704/ Luks (20.08.11) (1of2) (YouTube)

1970 births
Living people
People from Rakovník
Czech conductors (music)
Male conductors (music)
Czech musicologists
Czech harpsichordists
Czech music educators
20th-century conductors (music)
21st-century conductors (music)
20th-century Czech male musicians
21st-century Czech male musicians
Chevaliers of the Ordre des Arts et des Lettres